Hidetada (written: 秀忠, 秀匡 or 英忠) is a masculine Japanese given name. Notable people with the name include:

, Japanese handball player
, Japanese samurai
, Japanese shōgun
, Japanese bodybuilder

Japanese masculine given names